Nathaniel Freeman Jr. (May 1, 1766 – August 22, 1800) was a United States representative from Massachusetts. Born in Sandwich in the Province of Massachusetts Bay, he attended the common schools, graduated from Harvard University in 1787, and studied law. He was admitted to the bar about 1791 and commenced practice in Sandwich and the Cape Cod district. He served as brigade major in the Massachusetts militia for sixteen years, and was a justice of the peace in 1793.

Freeman was elected as a Federalist to the Fourth Congress and elected as a Democratic-Republican to the Fifth Congress, serving from March 4, 1795 to March 3, 1799. He died in Sandwich; interment was in the Old Burial Ground.

Nathaniel Freeman's uncle Jonathan Freeman was a U.S. Representative from New Hampshire.

References

1766 births
1800 deaths
Harvard University alumni
Democratic-Republican Party members of the United States House of Representatives from Massachusetts